Carol Edith Barnett (born 23 May 1949) is an American composer. She was born in Dubuque, Iowa, and studied at the University of Minnesota with Dominick Argento and Paul Fetler (composition), Bernard Weiser (piano) and Emil J. Niosi (flute). She graduated with a bachelor's degree in music theory and composition in 1972 and a masters in theory and composition in 1976.

After completing her education, Barnett went on the road, playing keyboard and singing background vocals with Mexican guitar player Ben Peña, worked as a freelance music copyist (1976-1997), and played in the Children's Theatre pit and various community orchestras (1980-2016).

She married Minnesota Orchestra violist John Tartaglia in 1985.

Barnett was composer-in-residence with the Dale Warland Singers from 1991 to 2001, and an adjunct instructor in music theory and composition   at Augsburg College in Minneapolis from 2000 to 2015.

She was awarded the 2003 Nancy Van de Vate International Prize for Opera for her chamber opera, Snow, and her music theater work Meeting at Seneca Falls was featured at the 2006 Diversity Festival in Red Wing, MN. The World Beloved: A Bluegrass Mass, commissioned in 2006 by VocalEssence and written with Marisha Chamberlain, had its Carnegie Hall debut in February 2013, and has become a favorite across the country.

Barnett is a charter member of the American Composers Forum. She resides in Minneapolis and works as a freelance composer.

Works

Works include:

 American Kaleidoscope (orchestra) 2010
 An American Thanksgiving (SATB divisi) 2003
 Angelus ad virginem (SATB divisi) 2010
 Aprile/April (SATB divisi) 1997
 Bega (SATB divis, piano) 2011
 By and By (SATB divisi) 1995
 Children of the Heavenly Father (SATB) 2000
 Children’Songs SATB, clarinet, piano) 1996
 Christmas Eve, Bells  (SATB divisi) 1991
 Cinco Poemas de Bécquer SATB divisi, soprano recorder, guitar, wind chimes) 1979
 Cindy (SATB divisi, piano or guitar)
 Concerto for Horn and Orchestra  1985
 Coy Pond Suite (big band) 2014
 Cyprian Suite (concert band) 2002
 Cyprus: First Impressions (alto flute, strings) 2000
 Dance and Sing (SATB, piano) 1991
 Dance of Zálongo (SA, SATB, claves, piano) 1998
 The Darkling Thrush (SATB divisi, string quartet) 2017
 The Day of Hope (women's chorus, oboe, percussion, harp) 2004
 Deep River (SATB divisi) 1994
 An Elizabethan Garland (SATB divisi) 1994
 Epigrams, Epitaphs SATB, 4-hand piano) 1986
 Four Chorale Meditations (violin) 1982
 Franklin Credo (SATB) 1996
 God Bless the Young Folk (SATB, piano) 2008/2017
 Golden Slumbers (SATB divisi) 1994
 Great Day (SATB divisi) 2005
 Hodie (SATB divisi) 1998
 I Sing the Birth (SATB divisi, percussion)  2003
 Ithaca (baritone, guitar) 2001
 The King of Yellow Butterflies (SATB divisi) 1993
 The Last Invocation (SATB divisi) 1988
 Little Potato (arrangement of the Malcolm Dalglish tune; SATB divisi) 1989
 Many Songs I’ve Heard: Melodies From Eastern Europe (2 pianos) 2012
 March to Glory: “Draw Me Nearer” (organ) 2013
 Marian Variants (concert band) 2008
 Meeting at Seneca Falls (soprano, mezzo, baritone, narrator, small instrumental ensemble) 1998
 Mortals & Angels: A Bluegrass Te Deum (SATB, fiddle, mandolin, banjo, guitar, bass) 2017
 Most Holy Night (SATB divisi) 2016
 Musica, Dei donum optimi (SATB divisi) 2016
 My People Are Rising (SA, violin, doumbek) 2017
 My Soul's Been Anchored in the Lord (SATB divisi) 2001
 Mythical Journeys (flute, guitar) 1991
 Near Odessa (SA, piano) 2013
 Nocturnes for Chamber Orchestra  1980
 Oh, Yes! (SATB divisi) 1996
 One Equal Music (TTBB divisi) 2001
 Overture to a Greek Drama (orchestra) 1994
 Piano (After D.H. Lawrence) 1996
 Pilot Me (SATB divisi) 2003
 Praise (organ, steel pan or marimba) 2007
 Prelude and Romp (concert band) 2008
 Red River Valley (SATB divisi, oboe, harp) 1991
 Remember the Ladies (SA, piano) 2011
 Requiem for Treble Voices (SSA) 1981
 Safe in the Arms of Jesus (SATB divisi) 2004
 Sappho Fragments (mezzo-soprano, soprano sax, vibraphone/marimba, bass) 2007
 Shaker Suite: Canterbury (woodwind quintet) 2014
 Shepherds, Rejoice! (SATB) 2012
 Sonata for Horn and Piano  1973
 Song of Perfect Propriety (SSA, piano) 2006
 A Spiritual Journey (SATB, jazz band, chamber orchestra) 1997
 Steal Away (SATB divisi) 1995
 String Quartet #1: Jewish Folk Fantasies  1986
 Sumervar (chamber orchestra) 1988
 Swing Low, Sweet Chariot (SATB divisi) 1994
 Swedish Lullaby (SATB, piano) 2012
 Syncopated Lady (piano) 1993
 Tagore's Lost Star (SATB divisi, harp) 2017
 Tirana (concert band) 2005
 A Tree Telling of Orpheus (SATB divisi) 2010
 Variations, Oh Yes! (clarinet, piano) 2008
 Variação (SATB divisi) 2000
 Verba Ultima (SATB, soprano sax) 1999
 Vignettes, After Pierides (flute, cello, piano) 2001
 Veni Sancte Spiritus (SATB divisi) 2005
 Voices (soprano, guitar) 1983
 We Clasp the Hands (SSA, piano) 2016
 Winter, Snow (SSA, piano) 2004
 Wonder Where (SATB divisi) 1996
 The World Beloved: A Bluegrass Mass (SATB, S/A/T soli, fiddle, mandolin, banjo, guitar, bass) 2006

Her music has been recorded and issued on CD, including:

Mortals & Angels: A Bluegrass Te Deum CD (2017) VocalEssence
Treasures from the Archive CD (September 9, 2014) Navona, ASIN: B00MHIKUSU
Voices of Earth & Air: Works for Chorus CD (July 30, 2013) Navona, ASIN: B00DJSUNU2
Choral Currents CD (June 1, 2011) Innova
Zeitgeist: Here and Now CD (March 29, 2011) Innova
Christmas a Cappella: Songs from Around the World CD (September 9, 2008) Cedille Records, ASIN: B001E1BO86
The World Beloved: A Bluegrass Mass Audio CD (November 13, 2007) Clarion, ASIN: B000XLQGNQ
Piccolo Four Hands CD (2007) Piccalota Productions
Souvenirs De La France Profonde (Tour of Southwest France 2007) CD Yale Schola Cantorum, ASIN: B00G6SBM16
Cyprus: First Impressions CD (July 2, 2006) Innova, ASIN: B000FFP0BY
Harvest Home: Songs from the Heart CD (October 11, 2005) Gothic, ASIN: B000B8QFBY
Christmas with the Dale Warland Singers CD (2002) Innova
Cantate Hodie: Bach Choir of Pittsburgh CD (2002) Gothic
Orchestral Miniatures: Volume V Contemporary American CD (May 30, 2000) Mmc Records, ASIN: B00004TV6E
Syncopated Lady Audio CD (July 27, 1999) Capstone, ASIN: B00000JLD5
My Soul’s Delight CD (August 1, 1998) Concordia Recordings, ASIN: B00005YB83
Blue Wheat: A Harvest of American Folk Songs CD (Jan 1, 1996) Gothic
Heartbeats: New songs from Minnesota for the AIDS Quilt Songbook CD (January 1, 1980) Innova, ASIN: B000004AFA

References

1949 births
20th-century classical composers
21st-century classical composers
American women classical composers
American classical composers
American music educators
American women music educators
Living people
University of Minnesota College of Liberal Arts alumni
21st-century American composers
20th-century American women musicians
20th-century American musicians
20th-century American composers
21st-century American women musicians
20th-century women composers
21st-century women composers